The 2008 United States Senate election in Massachusetts took place on November 4, 2008. Incumbent Democratic U.S. Senator John Kerry, who remained in the Senate after losing the presidency to incumbent President George W. Bush in the 2004 presidential election, won re-election to a fifth term in office. Four years into his term, Kerry resigned upon becoming United States Secretary of State in the Barack Obama administration.

Democratic primary

Candidates 
 John Kerry, incumbent U.S. Senator
 Edward O'Reilly, Gloucester city councilor

Campaign 
At the state convention on June 7, 2008, Edward O'Reilly received 22.5% of the vote, thereby granting him a spot on the September primary ballot.  Kerry, received the vast majority of votes, however, granting him the convention's endorsement.  On July 25, O'Reilly challenged Kerry to a series of debates, and the two eventually met for one debate in early September. On September 16, Kerry defeated O'Reilly in the Democratic primary.

Results

General election

Candidates 
 Jeff Beatty (R), military officer, businessman and nominee for MA-10 in 2006
 John Kerry (D), incumbent U.S. Senator
 Robert Underwood (L)

Campaign 
Democrat John F. Kerry, the incumbent since 1985, was the unsuccessful Democratic candidate for President of the United States in the 2004 election. He had historically attracted strong Republican challengers, including two former Massachusetts Republican Party Chairman, Ray Shamie in 1984, Jim Rappaport in 1990, and former state Governor William Weld in 1996.

Kerry had explored the possibility of seeking the Democratic nomination for President once again in 2008, a circumstance which prompted many of Massachusetts's all-Democratic House delegation, including Marty Meehan, Ed Markey and Stephen Lynch, to declare that they would run in the Democratic primary for Senate should Kerry not seek reelection. However, on January 24, 2007, Kerry announced that he would run for reelection to the United States Senate and not for the Presidency. A December 23, 2007, poll indicated his approval rating at 52%, with 43% disapproving.

Massachusetts held primary elections on September 16, 2008. Unlike in 2002, when Kerry was reelected against only third-party opposition, the Democratic nominee faced a Republican opponent in 2008. The Republican candidate, former U.S. Army Delta Force officer and FBI special agent Jeff Beatty who had lost a congressional race two years earlier, was not considered a serious contender in this overwhelmingly Democratic state. Massachusetts had not elected a Republican Senator since Edward Brooke in 1972, although Republican Scott Brown would go on to win a special Senate election in 2010.

On September 16, 2008, Kerry defeated Edward O'Reilly in the Democratic primary and faced Republican Beatty in the November general election.

Predictions

Polling

Results

See also 
 2008 United States Senate elections

References 
General

Specific
 John Kerry not running for President
 GOP ready to pounce on vulnerable poll
 Senator Kerry's SurveyUSA Job Approval Ratings
 7News/Suffolk University, Mass. Statewide Likely Voters

External links 
 Elections Division from the Massachusetts Secretary of State
 U.S. Congress candidates for Massachusetts at Project Vote Smart
 Massachusetts U.S. Senate from CQ Politics
 Massachusetts U.S. Senate from OurCampaigns.com
 Massachusetts U.S. Senate race from 2008 Race Tracker
 Campaign contributions from OpenSecrets
 Beatty (R) vs Kerry (D-i) graph of multiple polls from Pollster.com
 County Results - Election Center 2008 - Elections & Politics from CNN.com
Democrats
 John Kerry official campaign site
 Ed O'Reilly official campaign site
Republicans
 Jeff Beatty official campaign site
 Jim Ogonowski official campaign site
 Kevin Scott for Senate

2008
Massachusetts
United States Senate
John Kerry